In mathematics, the Wiener algebra, named after Norbert Wiener and usually denoted by , is the space of absolutely convergent Fourier series. Here  denotes the circle group.

Banach algebra structure
The norm of a function  is given by

where

The Wiener algebra  is closed under pointwise multiplication of functions. Indeed,

therefore

Thus the Wiener algebra is a commutative unitary Banach algebra. Also,  is isomorphic to the Banach algebra , with the isomorphism given by the Fourier transform.

Properties 

The sum of an absolutely convergent Fourier series is continuous, so

where  is the ring of continuous functions on the unit circle.

On the other hand an integration by parts, together with the Cauchy–Schwarz inequality and Parseval's formula, shows that

 

More generally,

 

Wiener's 1/f theorem

 proved that if  has absolutely convergent Fourier series and is never zero, then its reciprocal  also has an absolutely convergent Fourier series.

which is equivalent to Wiener's theorem.

See also
Wiener–Lévy theorem

Notes

References 
 
 
 
 
 
 
 

Banach algebras
Fourier series